Heidi Margaret Girolamo is an Australian politician. She was appointed to the South Australian Legislative Council representing the Liberal Party on 24 August 2021, to fill a casual vacancy caused by the resignation of David Ridgway.

On 22 April 2022, Girolamo was appointed as the Shadow Minister for Finance, Shadow Minister for Trade and Investment and Shadow Minister for the Circular Economy.

Prior to joining the parliament, Girolamo was a chartered accountant and worked at Deloitte Risk Advisory as a client manager. Girolamo was also Treasurer and Board Member of Kidsafe SA, a charity focused on accident and injury prevention for children, from June 2014 to August 2021. Additionally, she was the Vice President of the Liberal Party of Australia (South Australian Division), and is associated with the Right faction of the South Australian Liberal Party.

Girolamo was born and raised in Adelaide, with family living in regional South Australia. Girolamo also has a keen interest in focusing on early intervention services because of the importance of prevention across health, education and child protection.

References

Year of birth missing (living people)
Living people
Members of the South Australian Legislative Council
Women members of the South Australian Legislative Council
Liberal Party of Australia members of the Parliament of South Australia
21st-century Australian politicians
21st-century Australian women politicians